Ernest Carl Castle was a captain in the United States Navy.

Biography
Ernest C. Castle was born in Sioux Falls, South Dakota in 1926. He graduated from the United States Naval Academy in 1948. Castle was awarded the Silver Star for conspicuous gallantry in clearing a fouled mine from the otter  of the  during operations off Korea in May 1952. He was the Naval Attaché to Israel during both the USS Liberty incident and the Six-Day War. Castle served as US Navy investigator for the USS Liberty Incident. He criticized the Israeli explanation as to how the USS Liberty was attacked as ridiculous. He noted that the Liberty bore only a “highly superficial resemblance” to the El Quseir, the ship the Israeli government claimed they thought they were attacking. “Certainly IDF Navy must be well drilled in identification of Egyptian ships. El Quseir is less than half the size; is many years older, and lacks the elaborate antenna array and hull marking of Liberty.” He attributed the attack to “trigger happy eagerness to glean some portion of the great victory being shared by IDF Army and Air Force and in which Navy was not sharing.” Additionally, he served as military briefer for Robert McNamara during the Cuban Missile Crisis. He received the Meritorious Civilian Service Award from US President John F. Kennedy for his work during the crisis.

Castle earned his Ph.D. from the University of South Carolina in 1984, and joined the faculty there following retirement from the Navy.

References

See also 
The Liberty Incident: The 1967 Israeli Attack on the U.S. Navy Spy Ship, by A. Jay Cristo page xix
 MilitaryTimes http://valor.militarytimes.com/recipient.php?recipientid=55382
 Obituary https://www.dignitymemorial.com/obituaries/mechanicsville-va/ernest-castle-9379632

1926 births
2020 deaths
United States Navy personnel of the Korean War
Military personnel from South Dakota
United States Navy officers
University of South Carolina faculty